This is a list of Belgian television related events from 2014.

Events
16 March - Axel Hirsoux is selected to represent Belgium at the 2014 Eurovision Song Contest with his song "Mother". He is selected to be the fifty-sixth Belgian Eurovision entry during Eurosong held at the Sportpaleis in Antwerp.
3 May - Tom De Man wins the third season of The Voice van Vlaanderen.
24 October - 15-year-old Mentissa Aziza wins the first season of The Voice Kids.

Debuts

Television shows

1990s
Samson en Gert (1990–present)
Familie (1991–present)
Thuis (1995–present)

2000s
Mega Mindy (2006–present)

2010s
ROX (2011–present)
The Voice van Vlaanderen (2011–present)
Belgium's Got Talent (2012–present)

Ending this year

Births

Deaths

See also
2014 in Belgium